Marble Peak is a coastal peak, the twin of O'Brien Peak 2 nautical miles (3.7 km) to the southeast and almost the same height, overlooking the head of Ross Ice Shelf about midway between Amundsen and Scott Glaciers.

The peak was mapped by the United States Geological Survey (USGS) from surveys and U.S. Navy air photos, 1960–64. The name was applied by New Zealand Geological Survey Antarctic Expedition (NZGSAE), 1969–70, because there are light-colored, whitish bands of marble crossing straight over its summit.

References

Mountains of the Ross Dependency
Amundsen Coast